Phil Cutchin (September 9, 1920 – January 7, 1999) was an American football player and coach.  He served as the head football coach at Oklahoma State University–Stillwater from 1963 to 1968, compiling a record of 19–38–2. Although he never had a winning season at Oklahoma State, he led the team to their first win over Oklahoma in 20 years. He played college football at the University of Kentucky, where he subsequently worked as an assistant coach under coach Bear Bryant and accompanied Bryant to coach at Texas A&M and Alabama.

Head coaching record

References

1920 births
1999 deaths
American football quarterbacks
Alabama Crimson Tide football coaches
Kentucky Wildcats baseball players
Kentucky Wildcats football coaches
Kentucky Wildcats football players
Ohio Wesleyan Battling Bishops football coaches
Oklahoma State Cowboys football coaches
Texas A&M Aggies football coaches
People from Mayfield, Kentucky
People from Murray, Kentucky